The 2002–03 C.D. Marathón season in the Honduran football league was divided into two halves, Apertura and Clausura. Marathón was capable to win one tournament, having achieved the fourth championship in their history.

Apertura

Squad

Standings

Matches

Results by round

Regular season

Semifinals

 Olimpia won 3-2 on aggregate.

Clausura

Squad

Standings

Matches

Results by round

Regular season

Semifinals

 Marathón 1–1 Real España on aggregate score; Marathón advanced on better Regular season performance.

Final

 Marathón won 4–1 on aggregate.

Total scorers 

Only at Clausura
Only at Apertura

References

External links
Marathon Official Website 

CD Mara
C.D. Marathón seasons